Jamie Delgado and Jonathan Marray were the defending champions of the 2012 Aegon Pro-Series  but they decided not to participate together this year.
Delgado played alongside Ken Skupski, while Marray was involved in the 2012 ATP World Tour Finals.
James Cerretani and Adil Shamasdin won the final 6–4, 7–5 against Purav Raja and Divij Sharan.

Seeds

Draw

Draw

References
 Main Draw

Aegon Pro-Series Loughborough - Doubles
2012 Men's Doubles